Baiswara is a subregion of Awadh in Uttar Pradesh, India, which includes parts of Unnao and Raebareli districts. Unnao and Raebareli districts are part of Baiswara state. 

Baiswara is established by Bais Rajput king Abhaichand Bais. He was the 25th generation  of Raja Harshvardhan of Thaneshwar. It is associated with the Bais Rajput community.

References

Awadh